The Detroit Red Wings are a professional ice hockey team based in Detroit, Michigan. They are members of the Atlantic Division in the Eastern Conference of the National Hockey League (NHL) and are one of the Original Six teams of the league. There have been 28 head coaches in franchise history; three during the era of the Detroit Cougars (1926–1930) and Detroit Falcons (1930–1932) and the rest under the Detroit Red Wings (1932–present). Six Red Wings coaches have been inducted into the Hockey Hall of Fame as players: Jack Adams, Sid Abel, Bill Gadsby, Marcel Pronovost, Ted Lindsay, and Brad Park, while two others as builders: Tommy Ivan and Scotty Bowman. Adams, Bowman, Ivan, and Lindsay have also won the Lester Patrick Trophy, an award presented to those who have provided an outstanding service to hockey in the United States.

Barry Smith has the highest winning percentage of any Red Wings coach, with an .800 record from the five games he coached on an interim basis with Dave Lewis during the 1998 season. He is followed by Lewis who has a .672 winning percentage. Larry Wilson, who coached the 1977 season, has the lowest winning percentage (.139). Jack Adams coached the most games of any Red Wings head coach, 964 games during his tenure with the Cougars, Falcons and Red Wings. Adams also has the most regular season losses and ties. The Jack Adams Award, awarded annually to the National Hockey League head coach "adjudged to have contributed the most to his team's success", is named after him. Mike Babcock has the most regular season wins. Jacques Demers is the only NHL coach to have won the Jack Adams Award twice with the same team. Scotty Bowman also won twice, though with different teams: the first time, he was coach of the Montreal Canadiens. The current head coach of the Red Wings is Derek Lalonde, who was hired in June 2022.

Key

Coaches

Note: Statistics are correct through the 2017–18 NHL season.

See also
List of NHL head coaches

Notes
  A running total of the number of coaches of the Red Wings; thus, any coach who has two or more separate terms as head coach is only counted once.
  Prior to the 2005–06 season, the NHL instituted a penalty shootout for regular-season games that remained tied after a five-minute overtime period, which prevented ties.
 The term(s) column lists the first year of the season of the coach's first game and the last year of the season of the coach's last game. For example, someone who coached one game in the 2000–2001 season would be listed as coaching the team from 2000–2001, regardless of what calendar year the game occurred within.

References

 
Detroit Red Wings head coaches
head coaches